Winnertziinae is a subfamily of gall midges and wood midges in the family Cecidomyiidae.

Genera
These genera belong to the subfamily Winnertziinae.

Data sources: i = ITIS, c = Catalogue of Life, g = GBIF, b = Bugguide.net

Genera 

 Tribe Diallactiini Rubsaamen and Hedicke 1926 
 †Cretohaplusia Arillo and Nel 2000 Spanish amber, Albian
Diallactia Gagné 2004
 Ferovisenda Mamaev 1972
 †Ganseriella Fedotova and Perkovsky 2017 Burmese amber, Myanmar, Cenomanian
Gynapteromyia Mamaev 1965
Haplusia Karsch, 1877 i c g b
 †Palaeocolpodia Meunier 1904 (nomen dubium) Baltic amber, Eocene
Sylvenomyia Mamaev & Zaitzev 1998
Wyattella Mamaev 1966
 Tribe Heteropezini
 Brittenia Edwards 1941
†Cretomiastor Gagné 1977 Canadian amber, Campanian
 †Electroxylomyia Nel and Prokop 2006 Oise amber, France, Ypresian
 †Estoperpetua Fedotova and Perkovsky 2016 Sakhalin amber, Russia, Lutetian
 Frirenia Kieffer 1894
Henria Wyatt 1959
Heteropeza Winnertz, 1846 i c g b
Leptosyna Kieffer, 1894 c g b
 Miastor Meinert, 1864 i c g b
 †Monodicrana Loew 1850 Baltic amber, Eocene
Neostenoptera Meunier, 1902 c g b
Nikandria Mamaev 1964
 †Rasnitsia Fedotova and Perkovsky 2009 Rovno amber, Ukraine, Eocene
 †Stellasegna Fedotova and Perkovsky 2009 Rovno amber, Ukraine, Eocene
 †Tutkowskia Fedotova and Perkovsky 2008 Rovno amber, Ukraine, Eocene
 †Ventosagloria Fedotova and Perkovsky 2008 Rovno amber, Ukraine, Eocene
 †Vincinescia Fedotova and Perkovsky 2009 Rovno amber, Ukraine, Eocene
Tribe Winnertziini
Clinorhytis Kieffer 1896
†Cretowinnertzia Gagné 1977 Canadian amber, Campanian
Ekmanomyia Jaschhof 2013
Kronomyia Felt 1911
†Lebanowinnertzia Azar and Nel, 2020 Lebanese amber, Barremian
†Libanoclinorrhytis Azar and Nel, 2020 Lebanese amber, Barremian
Parwinnertzia Felt 1920
Rhipidoxylomyia Mamaev 1964 
Winnertzia Rondani, 1861 i c g b
Incertae sedis
Fertepidosis Fedotova & Sidorenko 2007
Vasiliola Fedotova 2004

References

Further reading

External links

 

Cecidomyiidae
nematocera subfamilies